Curt Meier (born January 1, 1953) is an American politician from the state of Wyoming. A Republican, he is the Wyoming State Treasurer. He was a member of the Wyoming Senate, representing the 3rd district from 1995 through 2019.

Meier was appointed to the Senate in 1995 after then-incumbent Republican Senator Jim Geringer was elected Governor of Wyoming. Meier was elected state treasurer in 2018, and took office on January 7, 2019.

References

1953 births
21st-century American politicians
Living people
People from Goshen County, Wyoming
University of Wyoming alumni
State treasurers of Wyoming
Republican Party Wyoming state senators